Leo Joseph Wisniewski (born November 6, 1959) is a former American football player whose position was nose tackle. Wisniewski played professionally in the National Football League from 1982 to 1984 for the Indianapolis Colts over the course of 36 games.

Early years
After going to high school at Fox Chapel Area High School in Pittsburgh, Pennsylvania, Wisniewski attended Pennsylvania State University where he played nose tackle. Over his four years at Penn State he recorded 102 tackles and 11 QB sacks. 
Leo has been a high school assistant coach in the Pittsburgh PA area for several years, coaching son Stefan at Pittsburgh Central Catholic before his departure for Penn State. In 2013, Leo was a member of the Canon-McMillah High School coaching staff, assisting former Penn State teammate Ron Coder in his first year as a high school head coach.

Professional career
Wisniewski was drafted in the second round (28th overall pick) in the 1982 NFL Draft by the Baltimore Colts. In 1982,  Wisniewski spent the first two games of the strike shortened season on injured reserve, but started at nose tackle the final seven. He was credited with 52 total tackles (32 solo) and 2.5 QB sacks. In 1983, Wisniewski played in 15 games (started 14) and made 95 total tackles (50 solo) and 5.0 QB sacks. He missed the game against the Chicago Bears (September 25, 1983) with a strained knee. In 1984, his final year, Wisniewski started in 14 of the 16 games, but missed the final two games on the injured reserve with a knee injury. He made 88 total tackles (51 solo) and 7.0 QB sacks.

Personal
Leo's brother Steve Wisniewski was a two-time All-American at Penn State as an offensive lineman, and an 8-time Pro Bowler with the Oakland Raiders. Leo's son Stefen is currently a Guard for the Kansas City Chiefs.

References

1959 births
Living people
People from Hancock, Michigan
People from Allegheny County, Pennsylvania
Players of American football from Pennsylvania
American football defensive tackles
Penn State Nittany Lions football players
Baltimore Colts players
Indianapolis Colts players